Acartauchenius orientalis is a species of sheet weaver found in Mongolia. It was described by Wunderlich in 1995.

References

Linyphiidae
Arthropods of Mongolia
Spiders of Asia
Spiders described in 1995